This is a list of prime ministers of Thailand by education.

List of prime ministers

List of multilingual prime minister of Thailand
Of the 29 persons who have served as prime minister of Thailand, at least third-quarter have displayed proficiency in speaking or writing a language other than Central Thai. Of these, eight of them also public image as Central Thai with other languages as compound bilingual. During the Cold War, Thai education was compelled to study English from the first grade to the twelve grade, Isan language also common in Thai media make most of recently Thai prime minister able to listen and read both in English and Isan shy to speak.

See also
 List of prime ministers of Thailand

References

Thailand 
Lists related to prime ministers of Thailand